Kalateh-ye Aqa Mohammad (also Romanized as Kalāteh-ye Āqā Moḩammad) is a village in Karizan Rural District, Nasrabad District, Torbat-e Jam County, Razavi Khorasan Province, Iran. At the 2006 census, its population was 174, in 35 families.

References 

Populated places in Torbat-e Jam County